José Manuel Núñez Martín (born 16 June 1997), commonly known as Chema or Chema Núñez, is a Spanish footballer. Mainly an attacking midfielder, he can also play as right winger.

Club career
Chema was born in La Puebla del Río, Seville, Andalusia, and represented Puebla CF (two stints), Sevilla FC, Coria CF (two stints) and Real Betis as a youth. He made his first-team debut for Coria on 28 February 2015, coming on as a late substitute in a 4–0 Tercera División away routing of UD Los Barrios.

On 15 August 2015 Chema joined UD Almería, returning to youth football. He was promoted to the reserves the following August, and scored his first senior goal on 9 October 2016 in a 4–1 home defeat of Dos Hermanas CF.

Chema was definitely promoted to the main squad in Segunda División ahead of the 2018–19 campaign, and made his professional debut on 17 August 2018, starting in a 0–1 away loss against Cádiz CF. He scored his first professional goal on 23 September, netting the last in a 2–0 away defeat of CD Numancia.

On 28 May 2019, Chema extended his contract until 2021. The following 22 January, he was loaned to Albacete Balompié for the remainder of the season.

On 17 September 2020, Chema terminated his contract with Almería, and signed a two-year contract with Alba just hours later. The following 1 February, he moved to Real Betis' B-team on loan for the remainder of the season.

References

External links

1997 births
Living people
People from Seville (comarca)
Sportspeople from the Province of Seville
Spanish footballers
Footballers from Andalusia
Association football wingers
Segunda División players
Segunda División B players
Tercera División players
UD Almería B players
UD Almería players
Albacete Balompié players
Betis Deportivo Balompié footballers
Primera Federación players
Real Unión footballers